This article contains lists of blues musicians by their respective genres and styles.

See also